Angel in the Dark is a 2001 album from American singer-songwriter Laura Nyro, released after her death and made up of recordings from 1994 and 1995.

Recording and release
Nyro recorded the album while participating in chemotherapy for the ovarian cancer that ultimately killed her in 1997; the recordings were not completed. The songs are her final recording sessions and were initially planned for release on a small independent label before being handed over to Rounder Records for a broader release and promotion of Nyro's career.

Reception

Critical reception
The editors of AllMusic Guide scored this album four out of five stars, with reviewer Ronnie D. Lankford, Jr. calling the album "a lovely recording featuring the graceful vocals and finely crafted songs that everyone expects from Laura Nyro" and "a fine coda, perfect for late-night listening, and a perfect companion to Nyro's other recordings". In The Austin Chronicle, Margaret Moser situates the release as part of Nyro's reflection on her impending death, noting that the cover versions include her influences and the original tracks discuss the most important themes in her life and music. Writing for Billboard, Michael Padletta called the album "aptly titled" for Nyro's "achingly beautiful" vocals, with her career as a songwriter being as accomplished as her influences present on this collection. His colleague Jim Bessman named it the top album of 2001.

Chart performance
Angel in the Dark entered the Top Internet Albums chart on July 28, 2001 at 17 and rose to eighth place on August 4.

Track listing
"Angel in the Dark" (Nyro) – 4:04
"Triple Goddess Twilight" (Nyro) – 3:59
"Will You Still Love Me Tomorrow" (Gerry Goffin and Carole King) – 5:59
"He Was Too Good to Me" (Lorenz Hart and Richard Rodgers) – 2:36
"Sweet Dream Fade" (Nyro) – 4:26
"Serious Playground" (Nyro) – 4:17
"Be Aware" (Burt Bacharach and Hal David) – 3:01
"Let It Be Me" (Gilbert Bécaud and Pierre Delanoë) – 2:13
"Gardenia Talk" (Nyro) – 2:44
"Ooh Baby, Baby" (Warren "Pete" Moore and Smokey Robinson) – 3:24
"Embraceable You" (George Gershwin and Ira Gershwin) – 2:08
"La La Means I Love You" (Thom Bell and William Hart) – 4:18
"Walk On By" (Bacharach and David) – 2:17
"Animal Grace" (Nyro) – 1:27
"Don't Hurt Child" (Nyro) – 3:22
"Coda" (Nyro) – 1:05
silence – 3:00
"Come and Get These Memories" (Nyro) – 1:25

An Super Audio CD release from 2002 includes alternate recordings of "Angel in the Dark" (2:41), "Ooh Baby, Baby" (3:29), and "Don't Hurt the Child" (3:30) before "Coda".

Personnel
"Angel in the Dark": recorded by Wayne Yurgelin, assisted by Robert Smith, at The Power Station, August 5, 1995, with additional recording by Steve Rosenthal, assisted by Albert Leusink at The Magic Shop
Laura Nyro – lead and harmony vocals and electric piano
Michael Brecker – tenor saxophone
Randy Brecker – trumpet
Bashiri Johnson – percussion
Tommy Mitchell – horn arrangement
Bernard Purdie – drums
John Tropea – electric guitar and horn arrangement
Freddie Washington – bass guitar

"Triple Goddess Twilight": recorded by Dan Gellert, assisted by Robert Smith at The Power Station, April 28, 1995
Laura Nyro – lead and vocal harmonies and acoustic piano

"Will You Still Love Me Tomorrow": recorded by Daryl Gustamaccio, assisted by Robert Smith at The Power Station, August 29, 1994, with production assistance by Peter Gallway
Laura Nyro – vocals and acoustic piano
Will Lee – bass guitar
Chris Parker – drums
Jeff Pevar – guitar
Carol Steele – percussion

"He Was Too Good to Me": recorded by Wayne Yurgelin, assisted by T. Gonz at River Sound, October 22, 1994
Laura Nyro – vocals and acoustic piano

"Sweet Dream Fade": recorded by Wayne Yurgelin, assisted by Robert Smith at The Power Station, August 5, 1995, with additional recording by Steve Rosenthal, assisted by Albert Leusink at The Magic Shop
Laura Nyro – vocals and electric piano
Michael Brecker – tenor saxophone
Randy Brecker – trumpet
Bashiri Johnson – percussion
Tommy Mitchell – horn arrangement
Bernard Purdie – drums
John Tropea – electric guitar and horn arrangement
Freddie Washington – bass guitar

"Serious Playground":  recorded by Dan Gellert, assisted by Robert Smith at The Power Station, April 28, 1995
Laura Nyro – lead and vocal harmonies and acoustic piano

"Be Aware": recorded by Daryl Gustamaccio, assisted by Robert Smith at The Power Station, August 30, 1994, with production assistance by Peter Gallway
Laura Nyro – vocals and acoustic piano
Will Lee – bass guitar
Chris Parker – drums
Jeff Pevar – guitar
Carol Steele – percussion

"Let It Be Me": recorded by Wayne Yurgelin, assisted by T. Gonz at River Sound, October 22, 1994
Laura Nyro – vocals and acoustic piano

"Gardenia Talk": recorded by Wayne Yurgelin, assisted by Robert Smith at The Power Station, August 5, 1995, with additional recording by Steve Rosenthal, assisted by Albert Leusink at The Magic Shop
Laura Nyro – vocals and electric piano
Bashiri Johnson – percussion
Bernard Purdie – drums
John Tropea – electric guitar and horn arrangement
Freddie Washington – bass guitar

"Ooh Baby, Baby": recorded by Daryl Gustamaccio, assisted by Robert Smith at The Power Station, August 30, 1994, with production assistance by Peter Gallway
Laura Nyro – vocals and acoustic piano
Will Lee – bass guitar
Chris Parker – drums
Jeff Pevar – guitar
Carol Steele – percussion

"Embraceable You": recorded by Daryl Gustamaccio, assisted by Robert Smith at The Power Station, August 28, 1994, with production assistance by Peter Gallway
Laura Nyro – vocals and acoustic piano

"La La Means I Love You": recorded by Daryl Gustamaccio, assisted by Robert Smith at The Power Station, August 29, 1994, with production assistance by Peter Gallway
Laura Nyro – vocals and electric piano
Will Lee – bass guitar
Chris Parker – drums
Jeff Pevar – guitar
Carol Steele – percussion

"Walk On By": recorded by Peter Gallway at Gallway Bay Music, March 1994
Laura Nyro – vocals and electric piano

"Animal Grace": recorded by Dan Gellert, assisted by Robert Smith at The Power Station, April 28, 1995
Laura Nyro – lead and vocal harmonies and acoustic piano

"Don't Hurt Child": recorded by Wayne Yurgelin, assisted by Robert Smith, at The Power Station, August 5, 1995, with additional recording by Steve Rosenthal, assisted by Albert Leusink at The Magic Shop
Laura Nyro – lead and harmony vocals and electric piano
Bashiri Johnson – percussion
Bernard Purdie – drums
John Tropea – electric guitar
Freddie Washington – bass guitar

"Coda": recorded by Wayne Yurgelin, assisted by Robert Smith, at The Power Station, August 5, 1995, with additional recording by Steve Rosenthal, assisted by Albert Leusink at The Magic Shop
Laura Nyro – lead and harmony vocals and electric piano
Bashiri Johnson – percussion
Bernard Purdie – drums

Technical personnel
Scott Billington – production
Tom Coyne – mastering at Sterling Sound, New York
David Gahr – photography
Dick Kondas – assistant mixing at Sorcerer Sound, New York, August 2000
Laura Nyro – production
Steve Rosenthal – mixing at Sorcerer Sound, New York, August 2000
Eileen Silver-Lilywhite – production
Jean Wilcox – design and illustration

References

External links

2001 albums
Albums produced by Scott Billington
Albums published posthumously
Laura Nyro albums
Rounder Records albums